UNESCO Goodwill Ambassador is an official postnominal honorific title, title of authority, legal status and job description assigned to those goodwill ambassadors and advocates who are designated by the United Nations. UNESCO goodwill ambassadors are celebrity and expert advocates of UNESCO (not diplomatic ambassadors) who use their talent or fame to spread the UNESCO ideals, especially attracting media attention. Other specialized categories of advocates include UNESCO Artist for Peace, UNESCO Champion for Sport and UNESCO Special Envoy.

Current UNESCO goodwill ambassadors
The following is a list of UNESCO goodwill ambassadors along with the projects and activities they support:

Former Ambassadors

See also
 Goodwill Ambassador
 FAO Goodwill Ambassador
 UNDP Goodwill Ambassador
 UNHCR Goodwill Ambassador
 UNODC Goodwill Ambassador
 UNFPA Goodwill Ambassador
 UN Women Goodwill Ambassador
 UNIDO Goodwill Ambassador
 UNICEF Goodwill Ambassador
 WFP Goodwill Ambassador
 WHO Goodwill Ambassador

References

External links
 UNESCO Goodwill Ambassadors

 
UNESCO
Goodwill ambassador programmes
United Nations goodwill ambassadors